Pagachi or Pa Gachi may refer to:
 Pa Gachi, Kohgiluyeh and Boyer-Ahmad
 Pagachi-ye Bahmai
 Pagachi-ye Mambini
 Pagachi-ye Markazi

See also
 Pagach (disambiguation)